The 2016 Texas Longhorns baseball team represented the University of Texas at Austin during the 2016 NCAA Division I baseball season. The Longhorns played their home games at UFCU Disch–Falk Field as a member of the Big 12 Conference. They were led by head coach Augie Garrido, in his 20th and final season at Texas.

Previous season
The 2015 Texas Longhorns baseball team notched a 30–27 (11–13) record and finished fifth in the Big 12 Conference standings. The Longhorns won the 2015 Big 12 Conference baseball tournament, earning the Big 12's automatic bid to the 2015 NCAA Division I baseball tournament. The Longhorns were selected for the Dallas Regional, where they lost their first game to Oregon State and were eliminated from the Tournament with a loss in their second game to Regional host Dallas Baptist.

Personnel

Roster
{| class="toccolours" style="border-collapse:collapse; font-size:90%;"
|-
! colspan=9 style=""|2016 Texas Longhorns Roster
|-
|width="03"| 
|valign="top"|
Pitchers
13 - Tyler Schimpf (RHP) - Sophomore
14 - Beau Ridgeway (RHP) - Freshman
15 - Eric Dunbar (RHP) -  Sophomore
19 - Connor Mayes (RHP) - Sophomore
24 - Chase Shugart (RHP) - Freshman
27 - Travis Duke (LHP) - Senior
29 - Jon Malmin (LHP) - Junior
30 - Josh Sawyer (LHP) - Junior
32 - Nicholas Kennedy (LHP) - Freshman
34 - Kyle Johnston (RHP) - Sophomore
35 - Blake Wellmann (RHP) - Freshman
38 - Ty Culbreth (LHP) - Senior
40 - James Nittoli (LHP) - Freshman
41 - Morgan Cooper (RHP) -  Sophomore
42 - Kacy Clemens (RHP) - Junior
43 - Chance Callihan (RHP) -  Freshman
45 - Nolan Kingham (RHP) - Freshman
49 - Parker Joe Robinson (RHP) -  Freshman
51 - Jake McKenzie (RHP) - Sophomore

|width="15"| 
|valign="top"|
Catchers 
1 - Tres Barrera - Junior
7 - Michael Cantu - Sophomore
37 - Matthew White - Freshman
46 - James Barton - Senior

Infielders
2 - Kody Clemens - Freshman
5 - Matthew Schmidt - Freshman
11 - Travis Jones - Sophomore
12 - Joe Baker - Sophomore
17 - Bret Boswell -  Sophomore
24 - Chase Shugart - Freshman
39 - Tate Shaw -  Freshman
42 - Kacy Clemens - Junior
51 - Jake McKenzie - Sophomore

|width="15"| 
| valign="top" |
Outfielders
4 - Kaleb Denny -  Freshman
6 - Tyler Rand - Freshman
8 - Brady Harlan - Freshman
11 - Travis Jones - Sophomore
33 - Patrick Mathis - Sophomore
47 - Ben Kennedy -  Sophomore50 - Zane Gurwitz - Junior|width="25"| 
|}

Coaching staff

Schedule and results

|-
! style="background:#BF5700;color:white;"| Regular Season
|- valign="top" 

|- bgcolor="#ffbbbb"
| February 19 || 6:00 pm || LHN || * || #40 || UFCU Disch–Falk Field • Austin, TX || L3–412 || Bohall(1–0) || Robinson(0–1) || – || 5,305 || 0–1 || –
|- bgcolor="#bbffbb"
| February 20 || 2:00 pm || LHN || UNLV* || #40 || UFCU Disch–Falk Field • Austin, TX || W11–2 || Culbreth(1–0) || Oakley(0–1) || – || 5,526 || 1–1 || –
|- bgcolor="#bbffbb"
| February 21 || 1:00 pm || LHN || UNLV* || #40 || UFCU Disch–Falk Field • Austin, TX || W7–0 || Duke(1–0) || Wright(0–1) || – || 4,891 || 2–1 || –
|- bgcolor="#ffbbbb"
| February 25 || 6:00 pm || LHN || #21 * ||  || UFCU Disch–Falk Field • Austin, TX || L0–112 || Viall(1–0) || Malmin(0–1) || – || 4,676 || 2–2 || –
|- bgcolor="#bbffbb"
| February 26 || 6:30 pm || LHN || #21 Stanford* ||  || UFCU Disch–Falk Field • Austin, TX || W4–3 || Johnston(1–0) || Beck(1–1) || Shugart(1) || 5,550 || 3–2 || –
|- bgcolor="#bbffbb"
| February 27 || 3:30 pm || LHN || #21 Stanford* ||  || UFCU Disch–Falk Field • Austin, TX || W9–0 || Culbreth(2–0) || Castellanos(1–1) || – || 6,623 || 4–2 || –
|- bgcolor="#ffbbbb"
| February 28 || 12:30 pm || LHN || #21 Stanford* ||  || UFCU Disch–Falk Field • Austin, TX || L1–11 || Hanewich(2–0) || Moyes(0–1) || – || 5,625 || 4–3 || –
|-

|- bgcolor="#bbffbb"
| March 1 || 6:00 pm || || at * ||  || Bobcat Ballpark • San Marcos, TX || W10–411 || Shugart(1–0) || Mazzoccoli(0–1) || – || 2,776 || 5–3 || –
|- bgcolor="#ffbbbb"
| March 3 || 6:00 pm || LHN || #30 * ||  || UFCU Disch–Falk Field • Austin, TX || L1–4 || Bain(1–1) || Kingham(0–1) || Martinez(3) || 4,480 || 5–4 || –
|- bgcolor="#ffbbbb"
| March 4 || 6:00 pm || LHN || #30 California* ||  || UFCU Disch–Falk Field • Austin, TX || L3–4 || Jefferies(3–0) || Johnston(1–1) || Martinez(4) || 5,280 || 5–5 || –
|- bgcolor="#ffbbbb"
| March 5 || 2:00 pm || LHN || #30 California* ||  || UFCU Disch–Falk Field • Austin, TX || L0–6 || Mason(2–0) || Culbreth(2–1) || Dodson(1) || 5,467 || 5–6 || –
|- bgcolor="#ffbbbb"
| March 6 || 12:00 pm || LHN || #30 California* ||  || UFCU Disch–Falk Field • Austin, TX || L7–10 || Martinez(1–0) || Malmin(0–2) || – || 5,083 || 5–7 || –
|- bgcolor="#bbffbb"
| March 8 || 7:00 pm || LHN || * ||  || UFCU Disch–Falk Field • Austin, TX || W12–3 || Cooper(1–0) || Brown(0–2) || – || 4,710 || 6–7 || –
|- bgcolor="#bbffbb"
| March 11 || 8:00 pm || || at #23 UCLA* ||  || Jackie Robinson Stadium • Los Angeles, CA || W7–5 || Malmin(1–2) || Canning(2–1) || Kingham(1) || 731 || 7–7 || –
|- bgcolor="#ffbbbb"
| March 12 || 4:00 pm || || at #23 UCLA* ||  || Jackie Robinson Stadium • Los Angeles, CA || L4–5 || Gadsby(1–0) || Wellmann(0–1) || – || 1,260 || 7–8 || –
|- bgcolor="#ffbbbb"
| March 13 || 2:00pm || || at #23 UCLA* ||  || Jackie Robinson Stadium • Los Angeles, CA || L3–6 || Molnar(1–1) || Malmin(1–3) || Gadsby(4) || 1,644 || 7–9 || –
|- bgcolor="#ffbbbb"
| March 15 || 6:35 pm || SECN+ || at #3 Texas A&M* ||  || Olsen Field at Blue Bell Park • College Station, TX || L4–5 || Ecker(1–0) || Culbreth(2–2) || – || 6,965 || 7–10 || –
|- bgcolor="#ffbbbb"
| March 18 || 6:00 pm || LHN || #28 * ||  || UFCU Disch–Falk Field • Austin, TX || L2–3 || Massey(2–1) || Mayes(0–2) || – || 4,587 || 7–11 || –
|- bgcolor="#bbffbb"
| March 19 || 6:00 pm || LHN || #28 Tulane* ||  || UFCU Disch–Falk Field • Austin, TX || W10–3 || Culbreth(3–2) || Massey(2–2) || Wellmann(1) || 5,297 || 8–11 || –
|- bgcolor="#ffbbbb"
| March 20 || 12:00 pm || LHN || #28 Tulane* ||  || UFCU Disch–Falk Field • Austin, TX || L3–5 || Simms(4–0) || Duke(1–1) || Rankin(1) || 4,737 || 8–12 || –
|- bgcolor="#bbffbb"
| March 22 || 6:00 pm || LHN || * ||  || UFCU Disch–Falk Field • Austin, TX || W11–2 || Kingham(1–1) || Shewcraft(3–3) || – || 4,560 || 9–12 || –
|- bgcolor="#bbffbb"
| March 24 || 6:00 pm || LHN || #9 TCU ||  || UFCU Disch–Falk Field • Austin, TX || W4–3 || Duke(2–1) || Baker(2–1) || Mayes(1) || 4,828 || 10–12 || 1–0
|- bgcolor="#bbffbb"
| March 25 || 6:00 pm || LHN || #9 TCU ||  || UFCU Disch–Falk Field • Austin, TX || W2–0 || Culbreth(4–2) || Howard(4–1) || Mayes(2) || 4,004 || 11–12 || 2–0
|- bgcolor="#ffbbbb"
| March 26 || 2:30 pm || FS1 || #9 TCU ||  || UFCU Disch–Falk Field • Austin, TX || L5–9 || Burnett(1–0) || Kingham(1–2) || – || 7,093 || 11–13 || 2–1
|- bgcolor="#ffbbbb"
| March 29 || 6:00 pm || LHN || Lamar* ||  || UFCU Disch–Falk Field • Austin, TX || L2–4 || Johnson(6–0) || Mayes(0–3) || Oquendo(3) || 4,391 || 11–14 || –
|-

|- bgcolor="#ffbbbb"
| April 1 || 7:00 pm || FS1 || at Oklahoma ||  || L. Dale Mitchell Baseball Park • Norman, OK || L1–6 || Andritsos(4–2) || Cooper(1–1) || – || 1,392 || 11–15 || 2–2
|- bgcolor="#bbffbb"
| April 2 || 3:00 pm || FSOK || at Oklahoma ||  || L. Dale Mitchell Baseball Park • Norman, OK || W5–3 || Culbreth(5–2) || Madden(1–1) || Sawyer(1) || 1,826 || 12–15 || 3–2
|- bgcolor="#ffbbbb"
| April 3 || 1:00 pm || FSOK || at Oklahoma ||  || L. Dale Mitchell Baseball Park • Norman, OK ||  L3–4 || Neuse(1–1) || Mayes(0–4) || – || 1,260 || 12–16 || 3–3
|- bgcolor="#ffbbbb"
| April 5 || 7:00 pm || LHN || * ||  || UFCU Disch–Falk Field • Austin, TX || L0–5 || Hernandez(2–3) || Kingham(1–3) || Skapura(1) || 4,654 || 12–17 || –
|- bgcolor="#bbffbb"
| April 8 || 6:30 pm || COX KS || at Kansas State ||  || Tointon Family Stadium • Manhattan, KS || W6–3 || Cooper(2–1) || Rigler(2–6) || Shugart(2) || 2,331 || 13–17 || 4–3
|- bgcolor="#bbffbb"
| April 9 || 2:00 pm || || at Kansas State ||  || Tointon Family Stadium • Manhattan, KS || W12–5 || Culbreth(6–2) || MaVorhis(3–3) || – || 2,331 || 14–17 || 5–3
|- bgcolor="#ffbbbb"
| April 10 || 1:00 pm || || at Kansas State ||  || Tointon Family Stadium • Manhattan, KS || L2–3 || Benenati(1–1) || Shugart(1–1) || – || 2,331 || 14–18 || 5–4
|- bgcolor="#ffbbbb"
| April 12 || 6:30 pm || || * ||  || Constellation Field • Sugar Land, TX || L2–3 || Combie(1–1) || Kennedy(0–1) || Hernandez(6) ||  || 14–19 || 5-4
|- bgcolor="#ffbbbb"
| April 15 || 4:00 pm || LHN || Kansas ||  || UFCU Disch–Falk Field • Austin, TX || L5–11 ||  || Krauth(3–4) || Cooper(2–2) || – || 14–20 || 5–5
|- bgcolor="#bbffbb"
| April 15 || 8:00 pm || LHN || Kansas ||  || UFCU Disch–Falk Field • Austin, TX || W8–6 || Johnston(2–1) || Weiman(1–4) || – ||  || 15–20 || 6–5
|- bgcolor="#bbffbb"
| April 16 || 4:30 pm || LHN || Kansas ||  || UFCU Disch–Falk Field • Austin, TX || W12–2 || Culbreth(7–2) || Goddard(2–3) || – ||  || 16–20 || 7–5
|- bgcolor="#bbffbb"
| April 19 || 6:00 pm || LHN || * ||  || UFCU Disch–Falk Field • Austin, TX || W7–5 || Ridgeway(1–0) || Delgado(0–1) || Shugart(3) ||  || 17–20 || 7–5
|- bgcolor="#ffbbbb"
| April 22 || 6:30 pm || FSSW+ || at #7 Texas Tech ||  || Dan Law Field at Rip Griffin Park • Lubbock, TX || L6–13 || Martin(6–0) || Dunbar(0–1) || – ||  || 17–21 || 7–6
|- bgcolor="#bbffbb"
| April 23 || 2:00 pm || FSSW+ || at #7 Texas Tech ||  || Dan Law Field at Rip Griffin Park • Lubbock, TX || W7–4 || Culbreth(8–2) || Moseley(4–3) || Kingham(2) ||  || 18–21 || 8–6
|- bgcolor="#bbffbb"
| April 24 || 2:00 pm || FSSW+ || at #7 Texas Tech ||  || Dan Law Field at Rip Griffin Park • Lubbock, TX || W17–1 || Johnston(3–1) || Howard(6–2) || – ||  || 19–21 || 9–6
|- bgcolor="#bbffbb"
| April 26 || 6:00 pm || LHN || Texas State* ||  || UFCU Disch–Falk Field • Austin, TX || W6–2 || Ridgeway(2–0) || Hallonquist(3–4) || – ||  || 20–21 || 9–6
|- bgcolor="#ffbbbb"
| April 30 || 2:30 pm || LHN || Oklahoma State ||  || UFCU Disch–Falk Field • Austin, TX || L0–3 || Hatch(4–1) || Cooper(2–3) || – ||  || 20–22 || 9–7
|- bgcolor="#ffbbbb"
| April 30 ||  || LHN || Oklahoma State ||  || UFCU Disch–Falk Field • Austin, TX || L3–6 || Elliott(6–2) || Culbreth(8–3) || Buffett(8) ||  || 20–23 || 9–8
|-

|- bgcolor="#ffbbbb"
| May 1 || 1:30 pm || LHN || Oklahoma State ||  || UFCU Disch–Falk Field • Austin, TX || L4–8 ||  ||  ||  ||  || 20–24 || 9–9
|- bgcolor="#bbffbb"
| May 3 || 6:00 pm || LHN || * ||  || UFCU Disch–Falk Field • Austin, TX || W7–0 ||  ||  ||  ||  || 21–24 || 9–9
|- bgcolor="#ffbbbb"
| May 6 || 5:30 pm || || at West Virginia ||  || Monongalia County Ballpark • Granville, WV || L2–11 ||  ||  ||  ||  || 21–25 || 9–10
|- bgcolor="#ffbbbb"
| May 7 || 3:00 pm || || at West Virginia ||  || Monongalia County Ballpark • Granville, WV || L7–14 ||  ||  ||  ||  || 21–26 || 9–11
|- bgcolor="#ffbbbb"
| May 8 || 12:00 pm || || at West Virginia ||  || Monongalia County Ballpark • Granville, WV || L5–9 ||  ||  ||  ||  || 21–27 || 9–12
|- bgcolor="#ffbbbb"
| May 17 || 6:00 pm || LHN || Texas State* ||  || UFCU Disch–Falk Field • Austin, TX || L2–3 ||  ||  ||  ||  || 21–28 || 9–12
|- bgcolor="#ffbbbb"
| May 19 || 6:00 pm || LHN || Baylor ||  || UFCU Disch–Falk Field • Austin, TX || L1–2 ||  ||  ||  ||  || 21–29 || 9–13
|- bgcolor="#ffbbbb"
| May 20 || 6:00 pm || LHN || Baylor ||  || UFCU Disch–Falk Field • Austin, TX || L1–3 ||  ||  ||  ||  || 21–30 || 9–14
|- bgcolor="#bbffbb"
| May 21 || 2:00 pm || LHN || Baylor ||  || UFCU Disch–Falk Field • Austin, TX || W7–6 ||  ||  ||  ||  || 22–30 || 10–14
|-

|- 
! style="background:#BF5700;color:white;"| Post-Season
|-

|- bgcolor="#ffbbbb"
| May 25 || TBD || || Oklahoma State ||  || Chickasaw Bricktown Ballpark • Oklahoma City, OK || L4–10 ||  ||  ||  ||  || 22–31 || 0-1
|- bgcolor="#bbffbb"
| May 26 || TBD || || Baylor ||  || Chickasaw Bricktown Ballpark • Oklahoma City, OK || W15–3 ||  ||  ||  ||  || 23–31 || 1-1
|- bgcolor="#bbffbb"
| May 27 || TBD || || Oklahoma State ||  || Chickasaw Bricktown Ballpark • Oklahoma City, OK || W12–8 ||  ||  ||  ||  || 24–31 || 2-1
|- bgcolor="#bbffbb"
| May 28 || TBD || || TCU ||  || Chickasaw Bricktown Ballpark • Oklahoma City, OK || W2–1 ||  ||  ||  ||  || 25–31 || 3-1
|- bgcolor="#ffbbbb"
| May 29 || TBD || || TCU ||  || Chickasaw Bricktown Ballpark • Oklahoma City, OK || L2–8 ||  ||  ||  ||  || 25–32 || 3-2
|-

| Legend:       = Win       = Loss      Bold = Texas team member''

All rankings from Collegiate Baseball.

Rankings

References

Texas Longhorns
Texas Longhorns baseball seasons
Texas Longhorns Baseball